Octosporella is a genus in the phylum Apicomplexa. This genus has been poorly studied and little is known about it. 
Species in this genus infect fish, lizards and echidnas.

History

This genus was created in 1942 by Ray and Raghavachari.

Taxonomy

The type species is Octosporella mabuiae.

Six species are currently recognised.

Description

The oocysts each have 8 sporocysts. Each sporocyst has 2 sporozoites.

References

Apicomplexa genera